Schmettau, or Schmettow, is the name of an ancient Silesian noble family.

History 
The family first appeared in Hungary and Serbia under the name Szmettay in the 14th century. The first records of the lineage of the family begin with Georg Smete, documented from 1562 to 1579, citizen and farmer in Neisse. Under King Matthias Corvinus, the family initially spread to Silesia, from which individual members of the family settled in Mecklenburg, Brandenburg and Denmark.

Titles 
On September 28, 1668, the family received a renewal diploma for her nobility and coat of arms from the Emperor Leopold I, and in 1701 was promoted to the status of "free lord". On February 17, 1717, Emperor Charles VI gave the family a baron diploma and on February 24, 1742, Emperor Charles VII elevated the family to the rank of count / earl, which King Frederick the Great recognized on July 2 of the same year. In 1822 another Prussian nobility diploma was awarded.

Prussian nobility
Silesian nobility
German noble families
Hungarian noble families